John Edward Houghton Owen (born 7 August 1971) is a former English cricketer represented Derbyshire between 1994 and 1999.

Owen was the son of David Owen who was a cricketer for the Derbyshire Second XI during the early part of the 1970s. Owen first played cricket for Derbyshire during the 1994 season, when he made his debut in the Second XI against Lancashire. From then on, he played consistently in the Second XI Championship, and made several appearances at first-class level. He was a right-handed batsman and a right-arm off-break bowler. With a highest first-class score of 105, one of only two centuries he made for the team, he often played as an opening batsman.

Owen played first-class cricket until 1997, and played for Derbyshire CB for the last time in 2002.

External links
John Owen at Cricket Archive

1971 births
Living people
English cricketers
Derbyshire cricketers
Derbyshire Cricket Board cricketers